Karl Gustav Johan Svensson (born 7 February 1987) is a Swedish professional footballer who plays for Allsvenskan club IFK Göteborg as a midfielder. Starting off his footballing career in Sweden with IFK Göteborg in 2005, he went on to play professionally in Turkey, Ukraine, China, and the United States before returning to Sweden in 2021. A full international between 2009 and 2021, Svensson won 32 caps for the Sweden national team and represented his country at the 2018 FIFA World Cup as well as UEFA Euro 2020.

Club career

IFK Göteborg
He played for a local team in Gothenburg as well as a French team in his youth but joined IFK Göteborg at the age of 14. He played there until 2010 and won the Swedish Championship with the club in 2007. Gustav was nominated as the Newcomer of the year in Swedish football the same season but lost out to Johan Oremo.

Bursaspor
On 1 September 2010, he signed a three-year contract with 2009–10 Süper Lig champions Bursaspor.

Tavriya Simferopol
On 7 July 2012, he signed a three-year contract with Ukrainian club Tavriya Simferopol. According to Svensson he was forced to flee Tavriya's native soil Crimea by bus during the 2014 Russian annexation of Crimea.

Return to IFK Göteborg
On 23 March 2014, he signed a four-year contract with his former club IFK Göteborg.

Guangzhou R&F
On 14 January 2016, he signed a three-year contract with Chinese club Guangzhou R&F.

Seattle Sounders FC
On 30 January 2017, Svensson joined MLS side Seattle Sounders FC. Svensson made his Sounders debut in the opening game of the 2017 season, starting at right back in a 2–1 loss to Houston. While he has also played as a center back, Svensson primarily plays as a defensive midfielder for the Sounders.

Guangzhou City
On 9 April 2021, Svensson returned to Chinese Super League side Guangzhou City.

Second return to IFK Göteborg 
On 22 July 2021, Svensson returned to IFK Göteborg for the second time, signing a two-and-a-half-year contract.

International career

Youth 
Making his debut in 2007, Svensson played 24 games for the Sweden under-21 team and was a part of the U21 team that reached the semi-finals of the 2009 UEFA European Under-21 Championship.

Senior 
In May 2018, he was named in Sweden's 23 man squad for the 2018 World Cup in Russia. At the 2018 World Cup, Svensson played in three games for Sweden as they were eliminated by England in the quarter-final. He started and played the full 90 minutes in the second-round game against Switzerland.

On 8 September 2020, Svensson was sent off for the first time in his senior international career in the first half after two yellow cards in Sweden's game against Portugal in the 2020–21 UEFA Nations League. He served as Sweden's team captain for the first time in a friendly game against Denmark on 11 November 2020, in his 30th international appearance.

In May 2021, he was named in Sweden's 26-man squad for UEFA Euro 2020. He appeared in the 1–0 group stage win against Slovakia as Sweden reached the round of 16 before being eliminated by Ukraine. Svensson announced his retirement from international football following the tournament, having won 32 caps for his country between 2009 and 2021.

Career statistics

Club

International

Honours
IFK Göteborg
 Allsvenskan: 2007
 Svenska Cupen: 2008, 2014–15
 Svenska Supercupen: 2008

Seattle Sounders FC
 MLS Cup: 2019

References

External links
 
 
 

1987 births
Living people
Footballers from Gothenburg
Association football defenders
Swedish footballers
Sweden international footballers
Sweden under-21 international footballers
Swedish expatriate footballers
IFK Göteborg players
Bursaspor footballers
SC Tavriya Simferopol players
Guangzhou City F.C. players
Seattle Sounders FC players
Allsvenskan players
Süper Lig players
Ukrainian Premier League players
Chinese Super League players
Major League Soccer players
2018 FIFA World Cup players
UEFA Euro 2020 players
Expatriate footballers in Turkey
Expatriate footballers in Ukraine
Expatriate footballers in China
Expatriate soccer players in the United States
Swedish expatriate sportspeople in Turkey
Swedish expatriate sportspeople in Ukraine
Swedish expatriate sportspeople in China
Swedish expatriate sportspeople in the United States